Ashok Bhattacharya is an Indian politician and the former mayor of Siliguri Municipal Corporation. He is a member of Communist Party of India (Marxist) (CPI(M)). He is a prominent leader of CPI(M) in the northern region of West Bengal. He was the Minister of Urban Development and Municipal Affairs in the Government of West Bengal for three consecutive terms (1996–2011).

Early life
He was born in 1949 in Siliguri of West Bengal in Independent India. He completed his graduation from University of North Bengal in Siliguri, West Bengal.

Political career

Ashok Bhattacharya started his political career as a corporator in Siliguri Municipal Corporation. He became the chairman of Siliguri municipality in 1987 and remained as the chairman till 1991. He was elected to the West Bengal Legislative Assembly from Siliguri (Vidhan Sabha constituency) as a CPI(M) candidate for the first time in 1991. He is a five-time MLA of West Bengal Legislative Assembly from Siliguri. He won elections from Siliguri in 1991, 1996, 2001, 2006 and 2016. In 1996, he became the Minister for Urban Development and Municipal Affairs in the Left Front Government in West Bengal under chief minister Jyoti Basu. He also continued as cabinet minister under chief minister Buddhadeb Bhattacharjee till 2011 when the Left Front Government lost the power to All India Trinamool Congress (AITC). In 2011 West Bengal Legislative Assembly election, he was defeated by AITC candidate Rudra Nath Bhattacharya in Siliguri. But he won from Siliguri again in 2016 West Bengal Legislative Assembly election against AITC candidate and former captain of India national football team Bhaichung Bhutia.

In May 2015, Ashok Bhattacharya became the Mayor of Siliguri Municipal Corporation after the Left Front won the municipal election in Siliguri. Ashok Bhattachrya lost the Siliguri corporation election 2021 by Md Alam Khan of TMC from ward number 6.

References

External links 
Member's List West Bengal Legislative Assembly

 

 

 

Living people
Communist Party of India (Marxist) politicians from West Bengal
West Bengal MLAs 1991–1996
West Bengal MLAs 1996–2001
West Bengal MLAs 2001–2006
West Bengal MLAs 2006–2011
West Bengal MLAs 2011–2016
West Bengal MLAs 2016–2021
People from Siliguri
State cabinet ministers of West Bengal
Mayors of places in West Bengal
West Bengal local politicians
Indian municipal councillors
West Bengal municipal councillors
1948 births